Michael C. Lerner (born June 22, 1941) is an American actor. He was nominated for the Academy Award for Best Supporting Actor for his role in Barton Fink (1991). Lerner has also played Arnold Rothstein in Eight Men Out (1988), Phil Gillman in Amos & Andrew (1993), The Warden in No Escape (1994), Mayor Ebert in Roland Emmerich's Godzilla (1998), Mr. Greenway in Elf (2003), and Senator Brickman in X-Men: Days of Future Past (2014).

Life and career
Lerner was born on June 22, 1941, in Brooklyn, New York City, of Romanian-Jewish descent, the son of Blanche and George Lerner, a fisherman and antiques dealer. He was raised in Red Hook, Brooklyn and in Solon, Ohio. His brother Ken and nephew Sam are also actors.

Lerner began his acting career in the late 1960s at the American Conservatory Theater (A.C.T.) in San Francisco. At the age of 24 he appeared as "Hieronymous the Miser" in a KPFA radio production of Michel de Ghelderode's Breugelesque play, Red Magic.

During the 1970s, Lerner began making several guest appearances in television shows such as The Brady Bunch, The Odd Couple and M*A*S*H. He appeared in three episodes of The Rockford Files.  In 1974, he appeared in the teleplay The Missiles of October, playing Pierre Salinger.

In 1970, Lerner made his film debut in Alex in Wonderland. He then went on to appear in supporting roles in various Hollywood movies such as The Candidate, St. Ives and the 1981 remake of The Postman Always Rings Twice. In 1991, after co-starring in Harlem Nights, Lerner played film producer Jack Lipnick in Barton Fink, for which he received an Academy Award nomination for Best Supporting Actor.

Lerner's later projects include the Christmas comedy Elf and Poster Boy, as well as appearing in television programs such as Law and Order: Special Victims Unit and Entourage.

In 2010, he appeared in London's West End production of Up for Grabs with Madonna.  Michael also appeared on BBC Radio Four in 2008 as a member of the cast of David Quantick's Radio Four's series One. He portrayed Senator Brickman in the Marvel Comics/Twentieth Century Fox film, X-Men: Days of Future Past.

In 2013, Lerner appeared in a Season 4 episode of Glee as Sidney Greene, an investor in the revival of Broadway musical Funny Girl. His character is on the panel of judges, watching the Rachel Berry character audition for the lead role. He reprised his role as Sidney in Season 5 in several New York-based episodes of the series, as Funny Girl opens on Broadway.

One of his favorite actors is Edward G. Robinson.

Selected filmography

Films

Television

References

External links

1941 births
American Conservatory Theater alumni
Living people
20th-century American Jews
21st-century American Jews
20th-century American male actors
21st-century American male actors
Alumni of the London Academy of Music and Dramatic Art
American male film actors
American male television actors
American male voice actors
American people of Romanian-Jewish descent
Jewish American male actors
Male actors from New York City
People from Bensonhurst, Brooklyn
People from Red Hook, Brooklyn